This list of Russian Earth scientists includes the notable geographers, geologists, oceanographers, meteorologists, ecologists and other representatives of Earth sciences from the Russian Federation, the Soviet Union, the Russian Empire and other predecessor states of Russia.

Alphabetical list


A
Vladimir Abazarov, geologist, discoverer of Samotlor oil field, the largest Russian oil field
Dmitry Anuchin, anthropologist and geographer, coined the term "anthroposphere", determined the location of the Volga river source
Andrey Arkhangelsky, geologist

B
Karl Baer, naturalist, formulated the geological Baer's law on river erosion, co-founder of the Russian Geographical Society
Valeri Barsukov, geologist
Vladimir Belousov, geologist
Lev Berg, determined the depth of Central Asian lakes, including Balkhash Lake and Issyk Kul, a head of the Soviet Geographical Society
Yuri Bilibin, geologist, studied placer geology and organized expeditions that discovered gold deposits in Eastern Siberia 
Mariya Borodayevskaya, geologist
Leonid Brekhovskikh, founder of modern acoustical oceanography, discovered the deep sound channel, the first to observe mesoscale ocean eddies

C
Feodosy Chernyshov, geologist
Ivan Chersky, paleontologist, geologist and explorer of Siberia, explained the origin of Lake Baikal, pioneered the geomorphological evolution theory
Pyotr Chikhachyov, early geographer and geologist of Central Asia, discovered Kuznetsk Coal Basin

D
Vasily Dokuchaev, founder of soil science, created the first soil classification, determined the five factors for soil formation

E
Raul–Yuri Ervier, geologist, organizer and head of wide-ranging geological explorations that discovered of the largest oil and gas fields in Western Siberia

F
Alexander Fersman, a founder of geochemistry, discovered copper in Monchegorsk, apatites in Khibiny, sulfur in Central Asia

G
Grigory Gamburtsev, Soviet seismologist, invented a number of seismological methods and devices
Boris Golitsyn, inventor of electromagnetic seismograph, the president of International Association of Seismology
Maria Glazovskaya, soil scientist and agrochemist.
Konstantin Glinka, influential Russian soil scientist.  
Ivan Gubkin, founder of the Gubkin Russian State University of Oil and Gas

K
Stanislav Kalesnik, geographer
Alexander Karpinsky, geologist and mineralogist, the first President of the Soviet Academy of Sciences
Alexander Keyserling, naturalist, a founder of Russian geology
Maria Klenova, a founder of marine geology, polar explorer
Wladimir Köppen, meteorologist and author of the commonly used Köppen climate classification
Nikolai Korzhenevskiy, geographer
Stepan Krasheninnikov, geographer, the first Russian naturalist, made the first scientific description of Kamchatka
Peter Kropotkin, geographer
Alexander Kruber, founder of Russian karstology
Nikolai Kudryavtsev, author of modern abiogenic theory for origin of petroleum, coordinated oil and gas exploration in Siberia
Leonid Kulik, meteorite researcher, the first to study Tunguska event

L
Dmitry Lachinov, meteorologist
Vladimir Larin, geologist
Irina Levshakova, paleontologist and geologist
Victor Linetsky, geologist
Mikhail Lomonosov, polymath, suggested the organic origin of soil, peat, coal, petroleum and amber; forerunner of the continental drift theory, pioneer researcher of atmospheric electricity

M
Alexander Middendorf, zoologist and explorer, founder of permafrost science, determined the southern border of permafrost
Pavel Molchanov, meteorologist inventor of radiosonde
Andrei Monin, meteorologist
Dmitrii Mushketov, geologist
Ivan Mushketov, made the first geological map of Turkestan
Konstantin K. Markov, geomorphologist

O
Vladimir Obruchev, geologist and explorer, author of the comprehensive Geology of Siberia and two popular science fiction novels, Plutonia and Sannikov Land
Alexander Obukhov, meteorologist

P
Fyodor Panayev, meteorologist
Vasiliy Podshibyakin, geologist, discoverer of Urengoy gas field
Pavel Polian, geographer
Mikhail Pomortsev, meteorologist, inventor of the nephoscope
Aleksandr Popov, permafrost researcher
Vladimir Porfiriev, geologist

R
Voin Rimsky-Korsakov, geographer
Vladimir Rusanov, geologist
Vasiliy E. Ruzhentsev, geologist

S
Farman Salmanov, discoverer of giant oil fields in West Siberia
Pyotr Semyonov-Tyan-Shansky, explorer of the Tian Shan Mountains, for 40 years the head of the Russian Geographical Society, prominent statistician and organiser of the first Russian Empire Census
Nikolay Shatsky, made a comprehensive tectonic map of North Eurasia, introduced Riphean and Baikalian geological stages
Pyotr Shirshov, polar explorer, founder of the Shirshov Institute of Oceanology, proved that there is life in high latitudes of the Arctic Ocean
Yuly Shokalsky, first head of the Soviet Geographical Society, coined the term "World Ocean"
Sergey Smirnov, geologist
Boris Sokolov, geologist
Kozma Spassky-Avtonomov, meteorologist

T
Mikhail Tetyaev, geologist
Andrey Tikhonov, mathematician and inventor of magnetotellurics in geology
Aleksey Tillo, made the first correct hypsometric map of European Russia, coined the term "Central Russian Upland", measured the lengths of the main Russian rivers

U
Nikolay Urvantsev, geologist
Mikhail Usov, geologist
Tatyana Ustinova, geographer

V
Nikolai Vavilov, geographer
Vladimir Vernadsky, philosopher and geologist, a founder of geochemistry, biogeochemistry and radiogeology, creator of noosphere theory, popularized the term "biosphere" and developed biosphere theory

Z
Sergey Zimov, geophysicist specialising in arctic and subarctic ecology, known for advocating the theory that human overhunting of large herbivores during the Pleistocene caused Siberia's grassland-steppe ecosystem to disappear, for raising awareness of the roles permafrost and thermokarst lakes play in the global carbon cycle, and for creating Pleistocene Park
Yevdokim Zyablovskiy, geographer

See also

List of geographers
List of geologists
List of meteorologists
List of Russian physicians and psychologists
List of Russian explorers
List of Russian biologists
List of Russian scientists
Science and technology in Russia

 
 
 
 
Earth scientists
Russian earth scientists